The Apple Feast of the Saviour or Apple Spas (sometimes the Feast of the Saviour on the Hill) is an Eastern Slavic folk name for the Feast of the Transfiguration, which is observed on August.

It is the second of the three Feasts of the Saviour. Taking its roots in Ukraine, this holiday just like the whole Orthodox Christianity later on was adopted in Russia. In Russian language it is Я́блочный Спа́с. One of three holidays in Russian Orthodox Christianity on which food items are blessed at church and then consumed by the faithful rather than priests, akin to the First Fruits of Judaism. The others are the Honey Feast of the Saviour, which is celebrated on August 14 (or August 1, Julian Calendar) and the Nut Feast of the Saviour, which is celebrated on August 29 (or August 16, Julian Calendar). 

The holiday has a pre-Christian origin and is associated with harvesting of ripe fruits, especially apples. In East Slavic folklore, it marks the beginning of autumn and means the transfiguration of nature. In the Byzantine Empire there was tradition to bless harvested grapes during the Feast of Transfiguration. In Ukraine apples are more common than grapes, hence the name of the feast. There are processions and blessings of harvests. Usually, on that day, people from Russia, Ukraine and Belarus eat apples, apple pies, or other dishes containing apples, even if they are not Orthodox Christians.

Feast of Transfiguration in Spas village. Ukraine 
 Blessing by Holy water of fruits during the celebration of the Feast of the Transfiguration in the Spas village (Kolomyia Raion) ( Спас (Коломийський район)), Ivano-Frankivsk region in Ukraine.

References

Eastern Orthodox liturgical days
Belarusian traditions
Ukrainian traditions
Russian traditions
Folk calendar of the East Slavs
August observances
Apple festivals
Slavic holidays